The enTourage pocket eDGe is a discontinued combined tablet computer and e-book made by enTourage Systems Inc., a small company based out of McLean, Virginia. It is the first follow on to the original EnTourage eDGe released earlier in 2010. The device runs Google's Android platform, version 2.2.  It is called by the manufacturer as the world's first mini-dualbook".

On May 23, 2011 the company announced that it would no longer manufacture and distribute the Pocket Edge.

Features 
The Pocket eDGe is a dual screen device. One screen is a touch-sensitive 6.0 inch E Ink display, while the other screen is a full color 7.0 inch LCD touch screen. The color display side runs Android.  Unlike most android devices, entourage pocket edge has its own suite of applications, rather than using the Android Market. Both displays are touchscreens, and the interface of the device provides interaction between the two according to appropriate actions and data formats. The LCD is designed for multimedia display, whereas the e-Ink screen is designed for reading and, in the corresponding mode, the ink can be marked as handwriting, indexed, searched, and even converted to text.

External links
 Official website

Reference list

Dedicated ebook devices
Electronic paper technology
Linux-based devices
Tablet computers
Touchscreen portable media players
Tablet computers introduced in 2010
Products and services discontinued in 2011